The 2022–23 Nevada Wolf Pack men's basketball team represented the University of Nevada, Reno during the 2022–23 NCAA Division I men's basketball season. The Wolf Pack were led by fourth-year head coach Steve Alford and played their home games for the 40th season at the Lawlor Events Center in Reno, Nevada. They participated as members of the Mountain West Conference for the 11th season.

Previous season 
The Wolf Pack finished the 2021–22 season 13–18, 6–12 in Mountain West play to finish in 8th place.

In the Mountain West tournament, the Wolf Pack defeated New Mexico 79–72 in the first round before losing to top-seeded Boise State 71–69 to end their season.

Offseason

Departures

Incoming transfers

2022 recruiting class

Roster

Schedule and results 

|-
!colspan=12 style=| Exhibition

|-
!colspan=12 style=| Non-conference regular season

|-
!colspan=12 style=| Mountain West regular season

 

  

  
  
 
|-
!colspan=12 style=| Mountain West tournament

|-
!colspan=12 style=| NCAA Tournament

Source

References 

Nevada
Nevada Wolf Pack men's basketball seasons
Run
Run
Nevada